The Connecticut Historical Society (CHS) is a private, non-profit organization that serves as the official statewide historical society of Connecticut. Established in Hartford in 1825, the CHS is one of the oldest historical societies in the US.

The Connecticut Historical Society is a non-profit museum, library, archive and education center that is open to the public. The CHS houses a research center containing 270,000 artifacts and graphics and over 100,000 books and pamphlets. It has one of the largest costume and textile collections in New England.

History

In 1825, a petition signed by citizens of Connecticut including Thomas Robbins, John Trumbull, Thomas Day, and William W. Ellsworth, was presented to the Connecticut General Assembly, calling for the establishment of a society to preserve historical materials. The General Assembly gave its consent, and the Connecticut Historical Society was established to collect objects important to the history of the Connecticut, and the United States more generally. The first elected officers were Trumbull, Day, Robbins, Thomas Church Brownell and Walter Mitchell.

With the rise in prominence of Hartford in the 1820s, the society's committee decided to house its first meetings in the city. Yet despite a flurry of activity, the society became inactive after 1825 and it was not until 1839 when new interest regained. The first official quarters for the CHS was over a store at 124 Main Street in Hartford.

The CHS' new ideals and direction were spearheaded by educationalist Henry Barnard, who recommended that the society enroll members from around the state, encouraged a history and genealogy magazine and retrieved speakers for lectures who could address groups throughout Connecticut.

As its collections expanded, the CHS moved into a room in the newly built Wadsworth Athenaeum in 1843. By 1844, the collection of Society had grown to include 250 bound volumes of newspapers, 6,000 pamphlets, and various collections of manuscripts, coins, portraits and furniture. New officers were elected including David D. Field. The CHS appointed Thomas Robbins as its first librarian because of his extensive book collection and antiquarian expertise.

Under Robbins' tenure, the new quarters were open six days a week and interpretive tours of objects were given. Some early objects in the collection were a chest of William Brewster, a tavern sign of General Israel Putnam and a bloodstained vest worn by Colonel William Ledyard at the Battle of Groton Heights. After the death of Robbins in 1856, Connecticut historians James Hammond Trumbull and Charles J. Hoadly contributed to the CHS through various published research and lectures. The first woman elected in the organization was Ellen D. Larned in 1870.

In 1893, the society hired Albert Carlos Bates as a full-time librarian and it was under his tenure that membership doubled, the annual income increased five-fold and the collection grew. To accommodate the expanding collection, the CHS bought a house on Elizabeth Street, which had previously belonged to the inventor Curtis Veeder, in the West End of Hartford. The building was altered between the 1950s and 1970s, to accommodate book stacks, exhibition galleries, an auditorium and a reading room.

In the early 2000s, the CHS hired Bruce Mau and Frank Gehry to design a new museum near Trinity College, but lack of funds prevented the project from happening. From 2003 to 2007, CHS operated the Old State House and created a permanent exhibit "History Is All Around Us".

Exhibits
Permanent exhibits include "Making Connecticut", about the history of Connecticut, and "Inn & Tavern Signs". There are also galleries for temporary exhibitions.

Recent exhibit topics include the American School for the Deaf, women and needlework,  the Kellogg brothers lithography firm, women's basketball, the Amistad,  a history of cleanliness,  the Civil War  and Eliphalet Chapin, an 18th-century furniture maker.

See also 
Albert Carlos Bates, librarian 1893-1940
George C. F. Williams, president 1919-22,1926-1934
Newton C. Brainard, president 1953-63

References

External links
Connecticut Historical Society (official site)

State historical societies of the United States
Historic preservation organizations in the United States
Libraries in Hartford County, Connecticut
History of Connecticut
Museums established in 1825
Museums in Hartford, Connecticut
Education in Hartford County, Connecticut
Historical society museums in Connecticut